Ventura (Italian, Portuguese and Spanish for "fortune") may refer to:

Places 
 Brazil
 Boa Ventura de São Roque, a municipality in the state of Paraná, southern Brazil
 Boa Ventura, Paraíba, a municipality in the state of Paraíba, in the northeast region of Brazil

 United States
 Ventura, California
 Ventura County, California
 Ventura Boulevard, in the San Fernando Valley of Los Angeles, California
 Buenaventura Lakes, Florida, a census-designated place (CDP) in northern Osceola County, Florida
 Ventura, Iowa, a city in Cerro Gordo County, Iowa
 Ventura Village, Minneapolis, a neighborhood within the Phillips community in Minneapolis 
 Ventura, Minnesota, former name of St. Augusta, Minnesota 
 Ventura, New Mexico, a census-designated place in Luna County, New Mexico, United States.

People 
 Surname
 Amy Austria-Ventura (born 1961), Filipino film and television actress
 Andrey da Silva Ventura (born 1993), Brazilian football goalkeeper
 Angiolino Giuseppe Pasquale Ventura (1919–1987), Italian actor who starred mainly in French films
 Antoni Reig Ventura (born 1932), Spanish Escala i corda Valencian pilota variant player
 Battista de Ventura (died 1492), Italian Roman Catholic Bishop of Avellino e Frigento 
 Bella Clara Ventura, Colombian-Mexican novelist and poet
 Carlos Eduardo Ventura (born 1974), Brazilian retired football forward or right-winger
 Cassie Ventura, American recording artist, dancer, actress and model, known mononymously as Cassie
 Charlie Ventura (1916–1992), tenor saxophonist and bandleader from Philadelphia, Pennsylvania
 Denis Ventúra (born 1995), Slovak football midfielder 
 Elsa Margarida Meira Ventura, Portuguese football midfielder 
 Elys Saguil-Ventura (born 2001), New Zealand tennis player 
 Felipe Ventura dos Santos (born 1984), Brazilian footballer who plays as a goalkeeper for Uberlândia Esporte Clube, known as Felipe
 Feliu Ventura (born 1976), Spanish singer-songwriter
 Francisco "Paco" C. Ventura, one of the pioneers in establishing motor racing in the Philippines in the 1960s
 František Ventura (1894-1969), Czech equestrian
 Gastone Ventura (1906-1981), Italian aristocrat 
 Gian Piero Ventura (born 1948), Italian football manager and former player
 Gilberto Ventura Ceballos (born 1975), Dominican serial killer 
 Gioacchino Ventura (dei Baroni) di Raulica (1792–1861), Italian Roman Catholic pulpit orator, patriot, philosopher and writer
 Giorgio Ventura (also Zorzi Ventura), Italian mannerist painter of the Venetian school
 Giovanni de Ventura,  municipal plague doctor for the town of Pavia
 Giovanni Ventura Borghesi (1640–1708), Italian painter of the Baroque period, active mainly in Rome
 Guglielmo Ventura (1249/50–c.1322), Italian merchant, public official and chronicler of Asti
 Hamilton Ventura da Conceicao (born 1983), Brazilian amateur boxer
 Héctor Ventura (born 1944), Mexican former field hockey player 
 Héctor Hugo Olivares Ventura (born 1944), Mexican politician from the Institutional Revolutionary Party
 Hugo Ventura Ferreira Moura Guedes (born 1988), Portuguese football goalkeeper
 Iñaki Astiz Ventura (born 1983), Spanish football central defender
 Isabel Ortega Ventura (born 1954), Bolivian Aymara-Quechua politician
 Jair Zaksauskas Ribeiro Ventura (born 1979), known as Jair Ventura, Brazilian retired football forward
 Jean-Baptiste Ventura (1794–1858), Italian soldier, mercenary in India and early archaeologist of the Punjab region of the Sikh Empire
 Jesse Ventura (born 1951), American media personality, former politician and retired professional wrestler
 João Pedro Ventura Medeiros (born 1994), Portuguese footballer
 Joaquín Alonso Ventura (born 1956), retired Salvadoran football player
 Joaquín Ferrándiz Ventura (born 1963), an incarcerated Spanish abductor, rapist and (later) serial killer 
 Johnny Ventura (1940–2021), Dominican singer and band leader
 José María Ventura Casas (1817-1875), Spanish musician and composer who consolidated the long sardana and reformed the cobla
 José Ramón Machado Ventura, M.D. (born 1930), Cuban revolutionary and politician, the First Vice President of the Council of State
 Julián Ventura Valero (born 1966), Mexican diplomat, who currently serves as Deputy Secretary of Foreign Affairs of Mexico
 Lino Ventura (1919–1987), Italian actor who starred mainly in French films
 Lucas de Souza Ventura (born 1998), simply known as Nonoca, Brazilian professional football midfielder 
 Luigi Ventura (born 1944), Italian Roman Catholic apostolic nuncio to France since 2009
 Manuel Mateus Ventura (1921-2018), Brazilian biophysicist, biochemist, and educator
 Maria Ventura (1888-1954), Romanian-French actress and theatre director
 Marlon Ventura Rodrigues (born 1986), or simply Marlon, Brazilian central defender
 Michael Ventura (born 1945), American novelist, film director, and cultural critic
 Miguel Ventura Terra (1866–1919), Portuguese architect
 Montserrat Carulla i Ventura (born 1930), Catalan actress
 Moses Ventura (called also Ventura of Tivoli and Ventura of Jerusalem), rabbi of Silistria, Bulgaria, in the latter half of the 16th century
 Orlando Ventura (born 1948), Mexican former field hockey player 
 Paolo Ventura (born 1968), Italian photographer, artist and set designer
 Ray Ventura (1908-1979), French jazz bandleader
 Reinaldo Miguel Silva Ventura (born 1978), Portuguese roller hockey player
 Robbie Ventura (born 1971), American former professional racing cyclist
 Robert Costa Ventura (born 1994),  Spanish football central defender
 Roberto Ventura (born 1957), Uruguayan neuropsychologist, psychiatrist, activist, musician, author and professor 
 Robin Ventura (born 1967), American former professional baseball third baseman and manager
 Rosmery Mamani Ventura (born 1985), Bolivian artist
 Santiago Ventura Bertomeu (born 1980), retired tennis player from Spain
 Santiago Ventura Morales (born 1968), Mexican social worker 
 Simona Ventura (born 1965), Italian television presenter, actress and singer
 Susana Ventura (born 1950), American performance artist, actress, and playwright 
 Vince Ventura (1917–2001), American professional baseball left fielder
 Yolanda Ventura (born 1968), Spanish actress and singer
 Yordano Ventura (1991–2017), Dominican professional baseball pitcher
 Zé Ventura (born 1996), Angolan football midfielder 
 Zuenir Ventura (born 1931), Brazilian journalist and writer

 Given name
 Ventura Alonzo (1904–2000), Mexican-born American musician
 Ventura Alvarado Aispuro (born 1992), American soccer player
 Ventura Benassai (died 1511), Italian Roman Catholic Bishop of Massa Marittima 
 Ventura Blanco y Calvo de Encalada (c.1782–1856), Chilean political figure
 Ventura Bufalini (died 1504), Roman Catholic Bishop of Terni (1499–1504) and Bishop of Città di Castello 
 Ventura Díaz (born 1937), former Spanish cyclist
 Ventura García Calderón, or Francisco García Calderón (1834-1905), lawyer and Provisional President of the Republic of Peru
 Ventura Gassol (1893-1980), Catalan poet, playwright and politician
 Ventura Mazza, or Mazzi or Marzi or Mazi or Magi (c.1560-1638), Italian painter of the late-Renaissance
 Ventura Miguel Marcó del Pont (1768-1836), Spanish merchant and treasurer for the Viceroyalty of the Río de la Plata
 Ventura Monge Domínguez (1914–1937), an infantry officer of the General Staff of the Spanish 
 Ventura Pons Sala (born 1945), Spanish movie director
 Ventura Rodríguez (1717–1785), Spanish architect and artist
 Ventura Ruiz Aguilera (1820–1881), Spanish lyric poet, called "the Spanish Béranger.”
 Ventura Tenario (1911–1984), with ring name of Chief Little Wolf, American professional wrestler

Transportation 
 Ventura Freeway, a highway connecting downtown Los Angeles with Ventura County, CA
 Lockheed Ventura, World War II aircraft
 Moyes Ventura, an Australian hang glider design
 MV Ventura, a cruise ship
 Pontiac Ventura, automobile produced by General Motors
 Ventura Bus Lines, Australian bus and coach company
 Ventura Intercity Service Transit Authority, a public transit agency providing bus service in Ventura County, California

Art, entertainment, and media

Fictional entities 
 Ace Ventura, a fictional pet detective in Warner Bros comedy films
 Las Venturas, San Andreas, a fictional city in Grand Theft Auto series of video games
 Marisa Ava Marie Ventura, fictional character of the American romantic comedy-drama Maid in Manhattan
 Sharon Ventura, also known as She-Thing, a fictional character appearing in American comic books published by Marvel Comics

Music 
 La-Ventura, Netherlands-based Gothic/melodic metal band
 Desmadrados Soldados de Ventura, a psychedelic music ensemble formed in Manchester
 Ventura (Phish album)
 Ventura (Anderson Paak album)
 Ventura (Los Hermanos album)
 "Ventura", a song by Thomas Bangalter from the Irréversible soundtrack, 2002
 "Ventura Highway", a 1972 song by the band America

Other uses 
 Ventura (Japanese guitars), a brand of stringed instruments imported from Japan by C. Bruno and Company during the 1960s and 1970s
 Ventura (horse), American race horse
 Corel Ventura, software package from Corel Corporation
 Paxman Ventura, diesel engine
 PortAventura World, an entertainment resort in Salou and Vila-seca, Tarragona, on the Costa Daurada in Catalonia, Spain
 Ventura Black Widows, a women's tackle football Tier 3 team, was founded in 2008 by Ahmad Newton of Los Angeles, CA
 Ventura Oil Field,  a large and currently productive oil field in the hills north of Ventura, in southern California
 Ventura Oilers, a California League baseball team based in Ventura
 Ventura Farms, a ranch featured in a number of Western films, located in the Hidden Valley in Thousand Oaks, California
 Ventura Film Festival, an international film festival held each year in Ventura, California
 Ventura Lambrate, an international design show, held annually in April in Milan, Italy
 macOS Ventura, the 2022 release of Apple's desktop operating system macOS

See also 
 Boa Ventura (disambiguation)
 Buena Ventura (disambiguation)
 Detour (disambiguation)
 Venture (disambiguation)

Italian-language surnames
Spanish-language surnames
Portuguese-language surnames